C-Tractor is a class of fourteen tractor tugs built by North American Shipbuilding between 1989 and 1993 for Alpha Marine Services, a subsidiary of Edison Chouest Offshore. The lead ship of the class was William M , also known as C-Tractor 1

C-Tractors measure .

In 2005, C-Tractor 1 was sold to Bay-Houston Towing Company and based in Corpus Christi, Texas.  Her sister ships continue to be owned by Alpha Marine; six - C-Tractor 2, C-Tractor 3, C-Tractor 4, C-Tractor 5, C-Tractor 12, C-Tractor 13 - were at one point chartered to the United States Navy.

C-Tractor 1

C-Tractor 1 (William M) was built in 1989.  In 2005 it was sold to Bay-Houston Towing Company and based in Corpus Christi, Texas.

References

Tugboats of the United States
1989 ships
Auxiliary tugboat classes